Paul Lovatt-Cooper (born 21 March 1976) is an English percussionist and composer. He currently holds the position of Director of Music at Factory Transmedia, and is the Managing Director of his music company PLC Music. Lovatt-Cooper is also Composer in Association with the Black Dyke Band.

Early life
Paul Lovatt-Cooper was born and raised in Alderney. His parents were Officers in the Salvation Army. He was quickly introduced into music by all of his family members who were all keen musicians and keen to keep the family tradition going. Lovatt-Cooper started his musical career by playing the drums at school at the age of twelve. He joined the school band shortly after, which led to an invitation to play for former British Open Champions Kennedy's Swinton Band. The invitation came from his music teacher and conductor of the band Kevin Bolton.

Career

Percussionist
As a percussionist, Paul Lovatt-Cooper has been moderately successful. At the age of 12 he began performing with the Kennedy's Swinton Band. He was invited to audition for the Williams Fairey Band in 1992 and passed. Lovatt-Cooper became a regular soloist and also became Principal Percussionist with the Williams Fairey Band. In 2003 Lovatt-Cooper left Faireys to join the Black Dyke Band as percussionist.

Composer
Paul Lovatt-Cooper started composing whilst at the University of Salford, studying under the brass and wind band composer Peter Graham.

After joining Black Dyke, the professional conductor Dr Nicholas Childs realised Lovatt-Cooper's potential as a composer. He soon had the band performing Lovatt-Cooper's works, starting with the world premiere of his Trombone Concerto "Earth's Fury" at Birmingham's Symphony Hall, which was recorded and broadcast on BBC Radio 2. In 2005 Lovatt-Cooper won the Brighouse and Rastrick Brass Band's 125th Anniversary Composers Competition with his piece "West Rydings".

Lovatt-Cooper's "Where Eagles Sing" was included as the finale to Karl Jenkins' CD This Land of Ours. "Where Eagles Sing" was also performed on BBC Radio 2's Friday Night is Music Night by the Band of the Coldstream Guards.

Lovatt-Cooper's music was featured in the gala concert of the National Championships of Switzerland 2007 by International Soloist David Childs where Lovatt-Cooper was the invited guest. Lovatt-Cooper's piece "The Dark Side of the Moon" was selected as a test piece for the regional championships 2008 and received performances all over the world. It has also been selected as the test piece for the Dutch National Championships 2008.

Lovatt-Cooper has written various works for youth bands; his first, "Solar Eclipse", was commissioned by Colin Duxbury and the Stockport Schools Band, who performed it at the National Youth Championships of Great Britain in 2000, in which they won. "The Big Top" was composed for the Wardle High School Junior Band as part of their award-winning performance at the National Festival of Music for Youth Final at Birmingham's Symphony Hall in 2006.

"Dream Catchers" was commissioned by the National Children's Band of Great Britain in 2007 and has since been performed at York Minster in the summer of 2008 by the Yorkshire Youth Band. Lovatt-Cooper was commissioned by the British Federation of Brass Bands to compose the test piece for the National Youth Championships of Great Britain 2009.

Discography
Walking with Heroes – Black Dyke Band
Only For You – Black Dyke Band
Where Eagles Sing – Band of the Army Air Corps
Regional's 2008 – Various
Fields of Remembrance – Grenadier Guards Band
Sirocco – Koninklijke Fanfare Band
Vitae Aeternum – New York Youth Band
Essential Dyke Volume 7 – Black Dyke Band
Essential Dyke Volume 8 – Black Dyke Band
Essential Dyke Volume 9 – Black Dyke Band
Essential Dyke Volume 10 – Black Dyke Band
It's a Musical Life – Leyland Band
Equilibrium – Camberwell Citadel Band
Shine – Les Neish
Monument – Brett Baker with the Black Dyke Band
Celtic Charm – David Childs with the Cory Band
Within Blue Empires – Black Dyke Band
Enter the Galaxies – The Cory Band
Karl Jenkins ‘This Land of Ours’ – The Cory Band
Horizons – Ratby Co-operative Band
A Christmas Carol – Black Dyke Band
Untold Stories – Owen Farr with the Cory Band
National Brass Band Championships 2011 – Various
Out of this World – The Cory Band
Quicksilver – Perry Hoogendijk
A Festival of Christmas Carols – Salvation Army
Welsh Gold Collection: The Great Welsh Singers – Various
Carols and Brass – Black Dyke Band with the Halifax Choral Society
Fire in the Blood – International Staff Band of the Salvation Army
Black Dyke Gold Vol 1 – Black Dyke Band
Elgar Variations – Brass Band Willebroek
A Second from Midnight – Jim Hayes with the Co-operative Funeralcare Band
The Holly and the Ivy – Montclair Citadel Band
Pressing Onward – New York Staff Band
On The Castle Green – 3rd Carrickfergus Band
Ten Years of Best Brass – Brassband Oberösterreich

References

External links
 

1976 births
Living people
English composers
Brass band composers